Tea for the Voyage is a six-piece Canadian ska band based in Kingston, Ontario. The group has been active in the Ontario and Quebec ska scenes since 2004. The group's music blends elements from ska, reggae, punk/ska, rocksteady and jazz into an eclectic and unique mix.

History 
Tea for the Voyage formed in 2003 as a small ska and reggae trio (guitar, bass and drums). By 2006, a three-man horn section of two saxophones and one brass had been added, bringing the total number of musicians in the group to six. 

Since 2006, the band has performed throughout Ontario and Quebec, and has shared the stage with notable artists such as The Planet Smashers, GrimSkunk, Chris Murray, Big D and the Kids Table, One Night Band, The Flatliners and The Johnstones. In 2007 Tea for the Voyage recorded their first full-length album, at Summit Sound in Westport, Ontario. The self-titled release consists of twelve tracks and was released on June 24, 2007. 

During the summer of 2007, the band's track "Toast" was used by skateboard company Concrete Wave as the theme for their 2007 Evolutions DVD.

In spring 2009, Tea for the Voyage released their second full-length album "Gimme Dem Beets!!!" independently. It was recorded at Long Shot Record's recording facility in Kingston, Ontario. The release contains 10 original tracks and was released on March 15, 2009.

External links
Official website
Official MySpace

Canadian ska groups
Musical groups from Kingston, Ontario
Musical groups established in 2004
2004 establishments in Ontario